Rosny Smarth (born October 19, 1940) was Prime Minister of Haiti briefly, from February 27, 1996 to June 9, 1997.  He resigned his post before a successor was found, leaving the post vacant for nearly two years. His political party is the OPL.

References

1940 births
Living people
Prime Ministers of Haiti
Struggling People's Organization politicians